Die Deutschen (“The Germans”) is a German television documentary produced for ZDF that first aired from October to November 2008. Each episode recounts a selected epoch of German history, beginning (first season) with the reign of Otto the Great and ending with the collapse of the German Empire at the end of the First World War. In November 2010 the second season of Die Deutschen was published in German television (ZDF and ZDFneo), beginning with Charlemagne,  the Frankish King, and ending with Gustav Stresemann, the Chancellor and Foreign Minister during the Weimar Republic.

Historical  events are recreated through a combination of live action scenes and computer generated animations. The series was filmed at over 200 different locations in Germany, Malta, and Romania at a cost of approximately €500,000 per episode.

First season

Second season

See also 
 America: The Story of Us

External links

 "Die Deutschen" on zdf.de, including full episodes (German)
 Six episodes dubbed in English, from DW. 

2008 German television series debuts
2010 German television series endings
German documentary television series
German-language television shows
ZDF original programming